Deuterium bromide is hydrogen bromide with the hydrogen being the heavier isotope deuterium. Hydrogen represents only a small fraction of the mass so it is not significantly heavier than typical hydrogen bromide.

See also
Hydrogen bromide
Heavy water (Water with deuterium in place of normal hydrogens.)

References

Bromides